March Route of Rochambeau's Army: Reservoir Road is a historic site in Newtown, Connecticut.  It was listed on the National Register of Historic Places in 2003.

It is along the march route taken by French commander Rochambeau's troops in 1781.

It is an undeveloped property.

It's one of multiple properties whose possible listing on the National Register was covered in a 2001 MPS study.

See also
March Route of Rochambeau's army
List of historic sites preserved along Rochambeau's route

References

Roads on the National Register of Historic Places in Connecticut
Historic districts in Fairfield County, Connecticut
Newtown, Connecticut
Historic places on the Washington–Rochambeau Revolutionary Route
National Register of Historic Places in Fairfield County, Connecticut
Connecticut in the American Revolution
American Revolution on the National Register of Historic Places